Edgar Willis is a jazz bassist.

Associated for many years with Ray Charles, Willis was also a member of the late 1950s Sonny Stitt Quartet, with Bobby Timmons and Kenny Dennis.

Discography 
With Curtis Amy
Mustang (Verve, 1967)
With Ray Charles
The Genius of Ray Charles (Atlantic, 1959)
With Hank Crawford
The Soul Clinic (Atlantic, 1962)
From the Heart (Atlantic, 1962)
True Blue (Atlantic, 1964)
Dig These Blues (Atlantic, 1966)
With David "Fathead" Newman
Fathead Comes On (Atlantic, 1962)
With Sonny Stitt
37 Minutes and 48 Seconds with Sonny Stitt (Roost, 1957)
Personal Appearance (Verve, 1957)

References 

Post-bop double-bassists
Hard bop double-bassists
Mainstream jazz double-bassists
American jazz double-bassists
Male double-bassists
Living people
21st-century double-bassists
21st-century American male musicians
American male jazz musicians
Year of birth missing (living people)